The 15th Pan American Games were held in Rio de Janeiro, Brazil from 13 July to 29 July 2007. Jamaica came in 13th place  in the final medals table, a drop in placing from the tenth spot in Santo Domingo (2003).

Medals

Gold

Men's Decathlon: Maurice Smith
Women's 4x100 metres relay: Sheri-Ann Brooks, Tracy-Ann Rowe, Aleen Bailey and Peta-Gaye Gayle
Women's 100 metres hurdles: Delloreen Ennis-London

Silver

Men's 200 metres: Marvin Anderson
Men's Shot Put: Dorian Scott
Women's 200 metres: Sheri-Ann Brooks
Women's 400 metres hurdles: Nickiesha Wilson

Men's Team Competition: Jamaica national football team

Bronze

Men's Welterweight: Ricardo Smith

Results by event

Basketball

Women's Team Competition
Preliminary Round
Lost to Brazil (69-81)
Lost to Canada (46-58) 
Defeated Mexico (69-46)
Classification Round
5th/8th place: Lost to Argentina (61-73)
7th/8th place: Lost to Mexico (56-63) → 8th place
Team Roster
Rashida Aikens
Kimberly Bennett
Latoya Byfield
Simone Edwards
Vanessa Gidden
Simone Jackson
Nicole Louden
Antoinette Messam
Oberon Pitterson
Rebecca Richman
Sharon Wiles
Demoya Williams

Football

Men's Team Competition
Preliminary Round
Defeated  (1-0)
Defeated  (2-0)
Defeated  (4-0)
Semi Finals
Defeated  (0-0, 5-4 on penalties)
Final
Team Roster
Dwayne Miller
Andrae Campbell
Ajuran Brown
Jermaine Jarrett
Ricardo Cousins
Eric Vernan
Keammar Daley
James Thomas
Edward Campbell
O'Brian Woodbine
Duwayne Kerr
Alanzo Adlam
Dawyne Smith
John-Ross Doyley
Norman Bailey
Damaine Thompson
Troy Smith
Draion McNain

Women's Team Competition
Preliminary Round
Defeated  (1-0)

See also
Jamaica at the 2006 Commonwealth Games
Jamaica at the 2008 Summer Olympics

External links
Rio 2007 Official website

Nations at the 2007 Pan American Games
P
2007